Nikolay Vladimirovich Vinogradov (born April 22, 1947) is the former governor of Vladimir Oblast, Russia.

Political career
In 1973 Vinogradov joined the Communist Party of the Soviet Union. He served in various roles in local party committees and the city administration for Vladimir until he was elected as governor (now as a member of the Communist Party of the Russian Federation) for the oblast in 1996. Vinogradov won re-election in 2000 and 2004, and after elections for governors were scrapped in favor of direct appointments by the Kremlin, was re-appointed as governor in 2009 by President Dmitry Medvedev. Vinogradov was also a member of the Federation Council from 1997 until 2001, where his was on the budget, tax policy, financial, currency and customs regulation, and bank activity committees.

Personal life
Vinogradov is married and has two daughters.

References

1947 births
Living people
Russian communists
Governors of Vladimir Oblast
Communist Party of the Russian Federation members